Harald Elschenbroich (born 19 June 1941) is a former international tennis player from West Germany. He competed in the Davis Cup from 1965 to 1975, and in the Australian Open four times, from 1963 to 1977.

Career finals

Singles (2 runner-up)

Doubles (1 runner-up)

References

External links
 
 
 

1941 births
Living people
West German male tennis players
Sportspeople from Mönchengladbach
Tennis people from North Rhine-Westphalia